Bound & Gagged may refer to:

 Bound and Gagged (comic strip), a syndicated newspaper comic strip drawn by Dana Summers 
 Bound & Gagged (magazine), a gay bondage magazine
 Bound and Gagged (serial), a 1919 spoof film serial
 Bound and Gagged: Pornography and the Politics of Fantasy in America, a 1996 book by Laura Kipnis